The Ptolemaic cult of Alexander the Great was an imperial cult in ancient Egypt in the Hellenistic period (323–31 BC), promoted by the Ptolemaic dynasty. The core of the cult was the worship of the deified conqueror-king Alexander the Great, which eventually formed the basis for the ruler cult of the Ptolemies themselves. The head priest of the cult was the chief priest in the Ptolemaic Kingdom, and years were dated after the incumbents (eponymous priests).

Background 
Following the death of Alexander the Great in 323 BC, his empire fell apart in the wars of the Diadochi (his generals, the Diadochi or "Successors"). One of them, Ptolemy, son of Lagos, secured rule of Egypt and made it the base for his own imperial ambitions. To legitimize his rule as Ptolemy I Soter ( BC), he relied, like the other Diadochi, not only on the right of conquest, but also on the supposed legitimate succession of Alexander. Not only did Ptolemy I portray himself as Alexander's closest friend in his historical work, but in 321 BC, he seized his body while Alexander's funeral procession was on its way to Macedon from Babylon, and brought it to the Egyptian capital at Memphis. This claim was particularly useful in Egypt, where Alexander had been greeted as liberator from the Achaemenid Empire (the so-called 27th and 31st dynasties) and had been enthroned as Pharaoh and son of the deity Ammon-Ra, receiving divine honours. During his stay in Egypt, Alexander had also laid the foundations for the city of Alexandria, which became the main Greek colony and capital of the country.

In the new Ptolemaic Kingdom, the Hellenic element (Macedonians and people from Greek city-states), to which the Ptolemaic dynasty itself belonged, formed the ruling class which succeeded the native Egyptian Pharaohs. While sacred kingship had long been practised in Egypt and other eastern nations, it was almost unheard-of in the Greek world. Driven by his unprecedented conquests, in the last year of his life Alexander had demanded even from his Greek subjects to be treated as a living god (apotheōsis). This was accepted only reluctantly, and often rejected outright, by the Greek cities, but Alexander's prolific founding of cities alone secured for him a divine status there, since Greek cities traditionally rendered their founder divine honours. When Ptolemy took over Egypt, he incorporated the heritage of Alexander into his own propaganda to support the claims of his own dynasty. As part of this effort, Alexander was elevated from a simple patron god of Alexandria to the status of a state god for the Greek populations of the entire Ptolemaic empire, even beyond the confines of Egypt.

Alexander as the chief god of the Ptolemies 

This office quickly advanced to become the highest priesthood in the Ptolemaic Kingdom, its prominence underscored by its eponymous character, i.e., each regnal year was named after the incumbent priest, and documents, whether in Koine Greek or Demotic Egyptian, were dated after him. The first priest of Alexander was no less a figure than Ptolemy I's brother Menelaos. The tenure lasted one year, but under Ptolemy I, the priests apparently held the post for longer tenures, while under his successors, with few exceptions, the tenures were reduced to a single year.

Under Ptolemy II Philadelphus ( BC), Alexander's body was brought to the sēma, and, in contrast to the usual Greek custom of cremation, was entombed in a magnificent golden sarcophagus, which was eventually replaced by a transparent glass coffin to display his preserved body. Not only did the presence of Alexander's body in the Ptolemaic capital enhance the dynasty's prestige, but it also became one of the main attractions and pilgrimage sites in the ancient Mediterranean. Even Roman emperors made the journey to Alexandria to visit the great conqueror's tomb. 

The Ptolemies assigned the deified Alexander a prominent place in the Greek pantheon, associating him with the Twelve Olympians like Zeus and Apollo. Accordingly, in documents Alexander was referred to simply by his name, as the epithet theos ("god") was regarded as superfluous.

The Ptolemies as temple-sharing gods 
While Ptolemy I Soter founded the imperial cult of Alexander, his son and successor Ptolemy II completed its connection to the ruler cult around the reigning dynasty itself. The cult of the Ptolemies began in 283/2 BC, when the deceased parents of Ptolemy II were deified as the "Saviour Gods" (θεοὶ σωτῆρες, theoi sōtēres). Statues of the deified couple were installed in the Temple of Alexander, and the priest of the Alexander cult took over the rites for the deified Ptolemies as well. With this gesture, the Ptolemies underlined the superior position of Alexander, and their own subordination to him as "temple-sharing gods" (synnanoi theoi). Alexander remained the main recipient of rituals and sacrifices, with the Ptolemies only partaking in them.

The elevation of Alexander over the Ptolemies, and their connection to him, was further deepened through the expansion of the cult. Thus in 269 BC, the female priestly office of "basket bearer" (kanēphóros) for the "Sibling Goddess" (thea adelphos) Arsinoe II was established, followed in 211 BC by the "prize-bearer" priestess (athlophoros) in honour of the "Benefactor Goddess" (thea euergetis), Berenice II, and in 199 BC by a priestess for the "Father-Loving Goddess" (thea philopatōr), Arsinoe III. All these priesthoods were subordinate to the priest of Alexander.

Cleopatra III added three further female priesthoods for her own personal cult as "Benefactor and Mother-Loving Goddess" (thea euergetis philometōr): the "sacred foal" (hieros pōlos), the "crown bearer" (stephanēphoros), and the "light bearer" (phōsphoros).

The concept of "temple-sharing gods" was underlined under Ptolemy IV Philopator ( BC), who translated the remains of the Ptolemies and their consorts—unlike Alexander, they had been cremated and kept in urns—to the sēma.

List of priests of Alexander 
The most recent list is W. Clarysse - G. Van der Veken, The Eponymous Priests of Ptolemaic Egypt, Papyrologica Lugduono-batava 24 (1983).

Ptolemy I Soter (305–282 BC)

Ptolemy II Philadelphos (285/282–246 BC)

Ptolemy III Euergetes (246–222 BC)

Ptolemy IV Philopator (222–205 BC)

Ptolemy V Epiphanes (205–180 BC)

Ptolemy VI Philometor (180–170 BC)

Ptolemy VI Philometor / Ptolemy VIII Physcon / Cleopatra II (170–145 BC)

Ptolemy VIII Euergetes II / Cleopatra II (145–141 BC)

Ptolemy VIII Euergetes II / Cleopatra II / Cleopatra III (141–116 BC)

Cleopatra III / Ptolemy IX Soter II (116–107 BC)

Cleopatra III / Ptolemy X Alexander I (107–101/88 BC)

Union of the priesthood to the royal title 
Ptolemy, son of Castor, is the last priest of Alexander known by name, before the position was merged into the royal office. Since the priesthood of Alexander is first attested in the royal titulature in the second year of the joint reign of Ptolemy IX and Cleopatra III (116/115 BC), it is unclear whether the merge of the offices took place in the last two years of Ptolemy VII's rule, or with the accession of his successors. It is possible that the merger was done at the initiative of Ptolemy IX, as part of an effort to emphasize his precedence over his co-ruling mother, Cleopatra III. As such, the office changed its role and character, from an eponymous priesthood to a propaganda tool: unlike the royal office, which was increasingly shared among siblings or other family members from the early 2nd century BC on, the priesthood of Alexander was indivisible. This must have appealed to Ptolemy IX, eager to set himself apart from his mother, who he hated and who had begun her own priestly cult around her own person.

This new role of the priesthood of Alexander can be traced in later reigns as well. In the first months of 112/111 BC, an ordinary citizen, Artemidorus, occupied the office. He was probably a partisan of Cleopatra III, who had succeeded to temporarily evict her son from Alexandria. As women could not occupy a supreme priesthood in the Greek world, she had to content herself with placing one of her supporters in the post, as a public sign of her new dominance. After Artemidorus, however, the name of Ptolemy IX was subsequently added in the papyrus, which means that he managed to return to Alexandria in the same year.

In 107 BC, Cleopatra III managed to expel Ptolemy IX for good from Alexandria, and raised her second son, Ptolemy X, to the throne as her co-ruler and priest of Alexander. As the inter-dynastic rivalry continued, however, in 105 BC she finally decided to assume the priesthood herself, to underline her precedence. Cleopatra probably intended this arrangement to be permanent, but her blatant violation of Greek norms in assuming the priesthood must have damaged her image among the Greeks. The last years of her reign were taken up with her persistent conflict with Ptolemy IX, until she died in 101 BC, probably following an assassination attempt by Ptolemy IX, whereupon Ptolemy X became sole ruler. The priestly and royal offices remained united under Ptolemy X and his successors, although the priestly title was rarely mentioned in the papyri, as the loss of its eponymous character rendered it irrelevant for dating purposes.

Abbreviations 

 BGU = Ägyptische Urkunden aus den Staatlichen Museen zu Berlin, Griechische Urkunden. (13 volumes published since 1895; New prints of Vols. I–IX, Milan 1972).
 CPJud = Victor A. Tcherikover, Alexander Fuks: Corpus Papyrorum Judaicarum. Vol. I, Cambridge (Massachusetts) 1957.
 London, BM EA = inventory numbers of papyri and inscriptions of the British Museum, London.
 OGIS = Wilhelm Dittenberger: Orientis Graeci inscriptiones selectae. Col. I, Leipzig 1903.
 P. Amh. = B. P. Grenfell, A. S. Hunt: The Amherst PapyrI 2 Vols. London 1900–1901.
 P. Amsterdam inv. = Papyrus inventory of the University of Amsterdam.
 P. BM Andrews = C. A. R. Andrews: Ptolemaic Legal Texts from the Theban Area. London 1990.
 P. dem. Berl. = Demotische Papyri aus den Staatlichen Museen zu Berlin., 3 Vols, Berlin 1978–1993.
 P. Bruxelles inv. = Papyrus inventory of the Royal Museums of Art and History, Brussels.
 P. Cair. Zen. = C. C. Edgar: Zenon Papyri Vols. I–V, Cairo 1925–1931.
 P. Cornell = W. L. Westermann, C. J. Kraemer Jr.: Greek Papyri in the Library of Cornell University. New York 1926.
 P. dem. Cair. = Wilhelm Spiegelberg: Die Demotischen Denkmäler. Col. I: Die demotischen Inschriften. Leipzig 1904; Vol. II: Die demotischen PapyrI Strasbourg 1908; Vol: III: Demotische Inschriften und Papyri Berlin 1932.
 P. Eleph. = Otto Rubensohn: Aegyptische Urkunden aus den königlichen Museen in Berlin. In: Griechische Urkunden. Extra issue: Elephantine Papyri Berlin 1907.
 P. Genf. I = J. Nicole: Les Papyrus de Genève. Vol. I, Geneva 1896–1906.
 P. Hamb. inv. = P. Meyer: Griechische Papyrusurkunden der Hamburger Staats- und Universitätsbibliothek. Leipzig/Berlin 1911–1924.
 P. Hib. I = Bernard P. Grenfell, Arthur S. Hunt: The Hibeh Papyri Part I, London 1906.
 P. Hib. II = E. G. Turner: The Hibeh Papyri Part II, London 1955.
 P. Hausw. = Wilhelm Spiegelberg, Josef Partsch: Die demotischen Hauswaldt Papyri: Verträge der ersten Hälfte der Ptolemäerzeit (Ptolemaios II.–IV.) aus Apollinopolos (Edfu). Leipzig 1913.
 P. KölnÄgypt. = D. Kurth, H.-J. Thissen und M. Weber (Hrsg.): Kölner ägyptische Papyri Opladen 1980.
 P. Köln II = B. Kramer und D. Hagedorn: Kölner Papyri Vol. 2, Opladen 1978.
 P. Köln VIII = M. Gronewald, K. Maresch und C. Römer: Kölner Papyri Vol. 8, Opladen 1997.
 P. Lond. III = F. G. Kenyon, H. I. Bell: Greek Papyri in the British Museum. Vol. III, London 1907.
 P. Mich. inv. = Papyrus inventory of the University of Michigan.
 P. Osl. = S. Eitrem, L. Amundsen: Papyri Osloenses. Vols. II–III, Oslo 1931–1936.
 P. Petrie = J. P. Mahaffy, J. G. Smyly: The Flinders Petrie Papyri Vols. I–III, Dublin, 1891–1905.
 P. BM. Reich = Nathaniel Reich J.: Papyri juristischen Inhalts in hieratischer und demotischer Schrift aus dem British Museum. Vienna 1914.
 P. BM Siut = Herbert Thompson: A Family Archive from Siut from Papyri in the British Museum. Oxford 1934.
 P. Strasb. = Papyrus grecs de la Bibliothèque Nationale et Universitaire de Strasbourg. Strasbourg 1912–1914.
 P. Tebt. I = B. P. Grenfell, A. S. Hunt, J. G. Smyly: The Tebtunis Papyri Vol. I, London 1902.
 P. Tebt. III = Bernard P. Grenfell, Arthur S. Hunt, J. Gilbart Smyly: The Tebtunis Papyri Vol. III, London 1933.
 PP VI = Willy Peremans, Edmond Van‘t Dack, Leon Mooren, W. Swinnen: Prosopographia Ptolemaica VI: La cour, les relations internationales et les possessions extérieures, la vie culturelle (Nos 14479-17250). In: Studia Hellenistica. Bd. 21, Louvain 1968.
 PP III/IX = Willy Clarysse: Prosopographia Ptolemaica IX: Addenda et Corrigenda au volume III In: Studia Hellensitica. Vol. 25, Louvain, 1981.
 PSI = Papyri Greci e LatinI Vols. I–XIV, Florence 1912–1957.
 SB = Hans A. Rupprecht, Joachim Hengstl: Sammelbuch griechischer Urkunden aus Ägypten. Vols. I–XXVI, 1903–2006.
 Stele 5576 = Urbain Bouriant: La Stèle 5576 du Musée de Boulaq et l’Inscription de Rosette. In: Recueil de travaux, Vol. 6, Paris 1885, pp. 1–20.

See also 
Veneration of the dead

Bibliography 

 Walter Otto: priest und Tempel im hellenistischen Aegypten. Vol. I, Teubner, Leipzig 1905, .
 Lily Ross Taylor: The cult of Alexander in Alexandria. In: Classic Philology. Vol. 22, 1927, pp. 162–169.
 S. R. K. Glanville, T. C. Skeat: Eponymous Priesthoods of Alexandria from 211 B.C. In: The Journal of Egyptian Archaeology. Vol. 40, 1954, pp. 45–58.
 J. IJsewijn: De sacerdotibus sacerdotiisque Alexandri Magni et Lagidarum eponymis. Brussels 1961, .
 L. Koenen: Cleopatra III als priestin des Alexanderkultes (P. Colon. inv. nr. 5063). In: Zeitschrift für Papyrologie und Epigraphik. Vol. 5 (1970), pp. 61–84.
 W. Clarysse, G. van der Veken: The Eponymous Priests of Ptolemaic Egypt. Brill, Leiden 1983, .

Cultural depictions of Alexander the Great
Ptolemaic Kingdom
Religion-related lists
Hellenistic religion